Dinesh Vijan is an Indian film producer and director who works in Hindi films. He is the founder of Maddock Films. He gave up his banking job in 2004 to pursue films. He has produced critically and commercially acclaimed films such as Stree, Hindi Medium, Luka Chuppi, Badlapur, Love Aaj Kal, Cocktail and Bhediya.

Filmography

Productions

Director

References

External links 
 

Year of birth missing (living people)
Living people
Film producers from Mumbai
Film directors from Mumbai
21st-century Indian film directors